Paul Giacobbi (born 4 June 1957 in Courbevoie, Hauts-de-Seine) was a member of the National Assembly of France until he retired at the 2017 Parliamentary Elections.  He represented the 2nd constituency of the Haute-Corse department,  and is a member of the Radical Party of the Left.

References

1957 births
Living people
People from Courbevoie
French people of Corsican descent
Radical Party of the Left politicians
French Ministers of Overseas France
Politicians from Île-de-France
Members of the Corsican Assembly
Deputies of the 12th National Assembly of the French Fifth Republic
Deputies of the 13th National Assembly of the French Fifth Republic
Deputies of the 14th National Assembly of the French Fifth Republic